Eupithecia specialis is a moth in the family Geometridae.

References

Moths described in 1920
specialis